Tomás González may refer to:

Tomás González (footballer) (born 1977), Paraguayan footballer
Tomás González (basketball), player for Real Madrid Baloncesto
Tomás González Estrada (born 1969), Colombian economist and politician
Tomás González (gymnast) (born 1985), Chilean gymnast
Tomás Ruiz González (born 1963), Mexican politician and the current Director General of the Mexican Lottery
Tomás González (sprinter) (born 1959), retired Cuban track and field sprinter
Tomás González (writer) (born 1950), Colombian writer

See also
Víctor Tomás (Victor Tomás González, born 1985), Spanish handball player